Lauryn Annyn Mark (née Ogilvie, born April 15, 1980, in Los Gatos, California, United States) is an American Australian Olympic Women's Skeet shooter.  She finished fourth in Women's Skeet in the 2004 Summer Olympics and won three gold medals at the 2002 Commonwealth Games and the 2006 Commonwealth Games. 
In March 2022 she was appointed by the Sports Authority of India to be the High Performance Manager for the National Rifle Association of India's Shotgun Team.

Career 
Lauryn Annyn Ogilvie was born on April 15, 1980, in Los Gatos, California, to clay shooter Jon Ogilvie. She started shooting in 1991, and started formally competing in June 1997 at the World Championships in Peru. She became the youngest competitor ever to win Women's Skeet in the United States Open Skeet Championship in 1999. In 2003, she won the silver medal in the Women's Skeet event at the World Cup Final in Rome.

After moving to Australia, Lauryn Mark won eight Australian National Women's Skeet Championships to her name. In 2012 she competed in her second Summer Olympics. She retired from competitive competition in 2014 and is now considered one of the world's leading coaches in her chosen discipline of Skeet shooting.

In 2012, she controversially became a men's magazine cover girl when she posed for Zoo Weekly wearing a bikini in Australian Olympic Team's green-and-gold color whilst holding a Beretta double-barrel shotgun.  The money she received for the photo shoot was donated to the Royal Children's Hospital in Melbourne.

Lauryn Mark was a contestant on the inaugural series of the Australian television series of Australian Ninja Warrior in 2017.

Personal life 
In 1999, Ogilvie established a corporate entertainment business, "Go Shooting" Pty. Ltd., with Australian Olympic gold medallist Russell Mark. She established the hugely successful "Go Shooting YouTube Channel" in 2018. She married Russell Mark in a surprise wedding ceremony on March 17, 2004, at a Hamilton Island beach. The couple have two children, Sierra Evelyn Mark (b. 23 June 2005) and Indiana Todd Mark (b. 29 January 2007).

References

1980 births
Australian female sport shooters
Commonwealth Games gold medallists for Australia
Living people
Olympic shooters of Australia
Shooters at the 2004 Summer Olympics
Shooters at the 2012 Summer Olympics
Skeet shooters
Shooters at the 2014 Commonwealth Games
Commonwealth Games silver medallists for Australia
Shooters at the 2002 Commonwealth Games
Shooters at the 2006 Commonwealth Games
Commonwealth Games medallists in shooting
Sportspeople from Santa Clara County, California
American emigrants to Australia
Medallists at the 2006 Commonwealth Games